The 2003 Indonesia Open in badminton was held in Batam, from August 26 to August 31, 2003.

Final results

References

External links 
 Tournamentsoftware.com	
 Tangkis.tripod.com

Indonesia Open (badminton)
Indonesia
Riau
2003 in Indonesian sport